George P. Huntley Jr. (26 February 1904 – 26 June 1971), born Bruce Timothy Huntley and often credited as G. P. Huntley Jr., was an American film actor. He was the son of stage actor G. P. Huntley, and played alongside Errol Flynn in The Charge of the Light Brigade (1936), Another Dawn (1937), and They Died with Their Boots On (1941).

He also made occasional appearances on the musical stage, such as in Gay Divorce.

References

External links

1904 births
1971 deaths
American film actors